Terry Carter (born John Everett DeCoste; December 16, 1928) is an American actor and filmmaker, known for his roles as Sgt. Joe Broadhurst on the TV series McCloud and as Colonel Tigh on the original Battlestar Galactica.

Early life
Carter was born in Brooklyn, New York City. His mother, Mercedes, was a native of the Dominican Republic, and his father, William DeCoste, was of Argentinian and African-American descent who operated a radio repair business. Carter graduated from Stuyvesant High School in Manhattan in 1946. He attended Hunter College, Boston University, and U.C.L.A. before earning a Bachelor of Science degree from Northeastern University. Carter left St. John's University School of Law after two years to become an actor.

Acting career
Carter gained theatre experience in several productions on the Broadway and off-Broadway stage. His Broadway credits include playing the male lead opposite Eartha Kitt in the play Mrs. Patterson and performing the title role in the musical extravaganza Kwamina.

From 1965 to 1968, Carter worked as a weekend newscaster for WBZ-TV in Boston, where he became an anchor-reporter. Some sources said he was the world's first black TV newsman.  During his three-year stint, he also served as New England television's first black opening-night movie and theater critic.  Although WBZ said he resigned from the station, Carter told the black press that he had been fired, because Westinghouse (which owned WBZ) objected to his personal involvement in numerous community projects. His departure left Boston without any black TV news reporters.

Carter also acted in numerous TV series, specials, and theatrical films. Carter was a regular cast member of The Phil Silvers Show (popularly known as Sergeant Bilko), appearing as Pvt. Sugie Sugarman in 91 episodes between 1955 and '59. Carter played boxer Rosie Palmer in a 1964 episode of the ABC drama Breaking Point. In 1965 he was the only black actor to have a role in the World War II drama Combat!, in the season three episode "The Long Wait". He played the part of Police Officer Tuttle in the 1974 children's film Benji. He is best known internationally for his co-starring role as Colonel Tigh in the popular science-fiction TV series Battlestar Galactica. He was originally cast as Lieutenant Boomer, but was cut following a roller skating accident that fractured his ankle. After replacing Carter with Herb Jefferson, Jr., producer Glen A. Larson instead offered Terry Carter the role of Colonel Tigh, second in command of the ragtag fleet of starships, giving the series the distinction for the time of having more than one regular African-American character in the principle cast. Carter also starred as Dennis Weaver's partner, Sergeant Joe Broadhurst in the detective series McCloud for seven years. He played opposite Pam Grier in the motion picture Foxy Brown. He played the role of CIA chief "Texas Slim" in Hamilton, a multinational action-adventure Swedish film (1999). More recently, Carter had a recurring role in Hotel Caesar, Norway's most popular soap opera, as Solomon Tefari, an Ethiopian businessman and father of one of the main characters.

Production career and later life
In 1975, Carter started a small Los Angeles corporation, Meta/4 Productions, Inc. for which he produced and directed industrial and educational presentations on film and videotape for the federal government. Carter is president of Council for Positive Images, Inc., a non-profit organization he formed in 1979, dedicated to enhancing intercultural and interethnic understanding through audiovisual communication. Under the council's auspices, Carter has produced and directed award-winning dramatic and documentary programs for presentation on PBS and distribution worldwide.

Selected projects
 Katherine Dunham Technique – Library of Congress
 A 2-½ hour presentation of the dance technique of anthropologist-choreographer Katherine Dunham. Funded by the Doris Duke Charitable Foundation, this video documentary is designed to serve as a study guide for dance teachers, scholars and dancers, as part of the Katherine Dunham Legacy Project of the Library of Congress.  In 2012, Terry Carter released The Katherine Dunham Technique as a DVD.
 A Duke Named Ellington - WNET-TV (PBS), American Masters Series (1988)
 This two-hour musical documentary features Ellington, reminiscing and performing, as soloist and with his orchestra. A Duke Named Ellington offers a retrospective of Ellington's half-century career, focusing primarily on his music and method, his artistic accomplishments and his role  in the development of modern music. A Duke Named Ellington had its world premiere on the PBS American Masters series, to critical acclaim. A Duke Named Ellington was selected as the official US entry in international television festivals in countries such as the People's Republic of China, France, Spain, Italy, Canada, Brazil, Poland, and Bulgaria. A Duke Named Ellington has been telecast in most countries of Europe, as well as in Japan, Australia, and South Africa. The program has been awarded the CINE Golden Eagle and the Golden Antenna. A Duke Named Ellington was nominated for an Emmy Award as "Outstanding Informational Special". In 2007, Carter released A Duke Named Ellington, the documentary he produced for PBS American Masters in 1988, as a DVD.
 Once Upon A Vision - KET-TV (PBS) (1991)
 This one-hour television documentary reveals the history of Berea, Kentucky, a unique 19th Century inter-racial colony founded in the midst of the slave-holding South. Before the Civil War, a group of abolitionists and former slaves began building a community based on unconditional racial and gender equality and participatory democracy. For more than half a century, withstanding persecution from slavers, pro-slavery politicians, and the Ku Klux Klan, these poor white and black settlers lived, and died for, their vision of multi-racial democracy. This program has become part of the secondary-school American History curriculum in Kentucky. Hosted and narrated by historian and author Alex Haley.
 JazzMasters - TV2/Denmark (1988)
 This series of 13 television portraits features musical artists in the world of jazz. An international co-production, JazzMasters was the first program series ever commissioned by TV2/Denmark. The JazzMasters series has been telecast in Scandinavia, France, Poland, Bulgaria and Japan. The series features programs about Chet Baker, Kenny Drew, Dexter Gordon, Johnny Griffin, Bobby Hutcherson, Carmen McRae, Palle Mikkelborg, James Moody, Clark Terry, Randy Weston, Niels Henning Ørsted-Pedersen, Herbie Hancock and Wayne Shorter.
 K*I*D*S - KCET-TV (PBS), US Department of Education (1984)
 This dramatic television miniseries was designed for public broadcasting to promote interracial and interethnic understanding among adolescents. K*I*D*S is the story of a multi-racial group of teenagers struggling to cope with some of the adult-sized conflicts confronting youth in America today. Endorsed by the National Education Association, K*I*D*S, accompanied by a teachers' guide, was also distributed on videocassette to secondary schools throughout the nation. K*I*D*S received an Emmy award in Los Angeles as "Best Series for Children and Youth".

Awards
 Emmy Award, Los Angeles, Best Series for Children and Youth, 1985, for K*I*D*S
 Emmy Nomination, Best Informational Special, 1989, for A Duke Named Ellington
 CINE Golden Eagle, 1989, for A Duke Named Ellington
 Golden Antenna, 1989, for A Duke Named Ellington
 Award for Excellence, L. A. Film Review Board, 1977, for Child Abuse & Neglect Series

References

External links

1928 births
Living people
Male actors from New York City
African-American male actors
American male film actors
American people of Argentine descent
American people of Dominican Republic descent
American male television actors
Television anchors from Boston
Boston University alumni
Hunter College alumni
Northeastern University alumni
People from Brooklyn
St. John's University School of Law alumni
Stuyvesant High School alumni
University of California, Los Angeles alumni
Journalists from New York City
21st-century African-American people
20th-century African-American people